FirstPlay was a video gaming online magazine published by Future Publishing for Sony Computer Entertainment Europe. It was produced by the team behind PlayStation Official Magazine and features video reviews and previews and screenshots of upcoming and recently released PlayStation 3 games. Episodes were released weekly on the PlayStation Store where users could choose to purchase a single episode or a 90-day subscription at a discounted rate.

Content
Editorial content in FirstPlay was scripted by Associate editor Nathan Ditum and writer Matthew Elliott with contributions from the Official PlayStation Magazine UK team. The videos were edited by a dedicated production team and narrated by Lucy Porter. All video content was presented in 720p. Each episode consists of four sections; HD Reviews & Previews, Network Highlights, Featured Downloads and Screenshot Galleries. Typically, each episode of FirstPlay has four features in each section.

The HD Reviews & Previews and Network Highlights sections both offer video content. This consists of reviews of recently released and upcoming PlayStation 3 games and previews of future games in the HD Reviews & Previews section while the Network Highlights section will include different video features each week such as round-ups of the best PlayStation Network games or user-created LittleBigPlanet levels. Advertisements of up to 30 seconds in length are run before each video feature. The user may choose to skip these after they have viewed five in total. Users can control the playback of video content in the same way that they can from video on the XMB, with the ability to pause, rewind, fastforward and skip.

The Screenshot Galleries feature screenshots of upcoming games. Each screenshot is accompanied by a voice-over providing commentary about a specific image, or general information about the game. The user can zoom into and pan around images and can also export images to their XMB to access from outside of FirstPlay.

The Featured Downloads section offers exclusive downloadable content which varies in each episode. This could include free add-ons for retail games, XMB themes, PlayStation Minis or other content.

History
Sony Computer Entertainment first announced in September 2008 that they were working with Future Publishing to produce an "on-console digital magazine" for PlayStation Network users in Europe. This was following the earlier release of Qore, a similar service available to users in North America. The service was initially scheduled for release in early 2009. In October 2009 it was revealed through a Future Publishing job listing that the service would be called Official PlayStation Magazine HD (or OPMHD). The product was finally announced as FirstPlay in February 2010 and it was confirmed that it would launch in Spring 2010. The first issue of FirstPlay was released on the PlayStation Store on 8 April 2010.

In July 2011 SCEE announced that the FirstPlay service was to end, leaving 6 July episode as the final FirstPlay to be released. The announcement went on to confirm that a new, yet-to-be-named service would replace FirstPlay, its focus shifting to SCEE's PlayStation Access events. As with its predecessor this new service would be produced by Future Publishing and delivered via the PSN Store, however this time the show would be free of charge.

Presenters
Lucy Porter (main)
Rachel Weber (episodes 28-33, and 48)
Niamh Shaw (episodes 25 and 26)

Editorial Team
 Nathan Ditum  Associate editor
 Matthew Elliott  Freelance writer

Production Team
 David Boddington  Content producer
 James Jarvis  Assistant producer
 Liz Wilson  PS3 Developer
 Paul Stevenson  Video editor
 Dan Read  Video editor

Episodes and Reception
FirstPlay had a total of 64 episodes, the last episode being on 6 July 2011. It is due to be replaced with a new show.

FirstPlay initially received a generally mixed reaction from viewers. Many complained about the lack of content in each episode, the unfulfilled promise of exclusive downloadable content and the fact that it was only available in the United Kingdom. The initial episodes received an average rating of 3.8 stars out of five on the PlayStation Store's ratings system. Overtime, viewer opinions became more positive, with many agreeing that content has improved and the writing has become tighter, while still criticizing the relative lack of expansion to other territories. Later episodes have received an average rating of 4.4 stars out of five.

Expansion
Originally only available in the United Kingdom, FirstPlay expanded to the Republic of Ireland on 19 May 2010, during the show's seventh episode, with expansion to further regions promised in the future.

Qore

Qore is an electronic magazine similar to FirstPlay, produced by Future Publishing. Released in June 2008, it is available to PlayStation 3 users via the PlayStation Store in the USA. Like FirstPlay, Qore offers exclusive videos, demos and downloads. but is released monthly instead of weekly.

References

Online magazines published in the United Kingdom
Video game magazines published in the United Kingdom
Magazines established in 2010
PlayStation (brand) magazines
PlayStation 3
PlayStation Store